Elaine Cunningham (born August 12, 1957 in New York City) is an American fantasy and science fiction author, especially known for her contributions to the Dungeons & Dragons role playing game campaign setting of Forgotten Realms.

Biography
Cunningham was born in New York City, and grew up in New York state and New England. A voracious reader since childhood, she earned a degree in music education with a minor in history.

She started writing in 1987, after her older son was born. A lifelong fascination with folklore and mythology led her to the fantasy genre, and her background in music and history gave her an affinity for bards such as Danilo Thann, created for her first novel, Elfshadow (1991). Many of her stories focus on elves, which she attributes to her excessive fondness for cats.

Cunningham is also the New York Times bestselling author of Dark Journey, book 10 from the Star Wars New Jedi Order saga. Shadows in the Starlight (2006), the second book the Changeling Detective series, was named to the 2006 Kirkus Reviews list “Ten Best SciFi Novels."

Personal life
Now a full-time arts administrator, Cunningham continues to write, albeit mostly in the early morning hours. She lives in coastal Rhode Island.

Bibliography
 Songs & Swords (featuring Arilyn, Danilo and Elaith)
 I. Elfshadow (1991/2000 reprint)
 II. Elfsong (1994/2000 reprint)
 III. Silver Shadows (1996/2001 reprint)
 IV. Thornhold (1998/2001 reprint)
 V. The Dream Spheres (1999)
Spelljammer anthology novellas
The Cloakmaster Cycle
The Radiant Dragon (1992), ISBN 9781560763468 
 Starlight and Shadows (featuring Liriel, Fyodor, and Gorlist)
 I. Daughter of the Drow (1995)
 II. Tangled Webs (1996)
 III. Windwalker (2003)
 Evermeet: Island of Elves (1998)
 Counselors & Kings (featuring Matteo and Tzigone)
 I. The Magehound (2000)
 II. The Floodgate (2001)
 III. The Wizardwar (2002)
 City of Splendors: A Novel of Waterdeep (With Ed Greenwood; 2005)
Forgotten Realms anthology novellas
The Best of the Realms, Book 1 (2003)
 "Rite of Blood"—Realms of the Underdark (1996)
The Best of the Realms, Book III: The Stories of Elaine Cunningham (2007)
 "The Bargain"—Realms of Valor (1993)
 "The More Things Change"—Realms of Infamy (1994)
 "The Direct Approach"—Realms of Magic (1995)
 "Secrets of Blood, Spirits of the Sea"—Realms of the Arcane (1997)
 "The Great Hunt"—Dragon magazine #246 (1998)
 "Speaking with the Dead"—Realms of Mystery (1998)
 "Stolen Dreams"—Dragon magazine #259 (1999)
 "Fire is Fire"—Realms of the Deep (2000)
 "Possessions"—Dragon magazine #282 (2002)
 "A Little Knowledge"—Realms of Shadow (2002)
 "Gorlist's Dragon"—Realms of Dragons (2004)
 "Games of Chance"—Dragon magazine #335 (2005)
 "The Knights of Samular"
 "Tribute"
 "Answered Prayers"
 Del Rey's Star Wars books
 Dark Journey, Book 12 of the New Jedi Order series (featuring Jaina Solo)
The Changeling Detective Agency series
 I. Shadows in the Darkness (2004)
 II. Shadows in the Starlight (2006)
Pathfinder Tales series
 Winter Witch (2010), ISBN 978-1-60125-286-9, with Dave Gross

Quotes
(From Candlekeep web forums): Ravens and crows will also interact with humans. Occasionally they'll imitate human behavior (such as helping gardeners pull weeds.) Sometimes they're willing to cut a deal. I've got one going with the local "raven mafia." They always gather on trash pickup day, but in exchange for some "protection bread," they'll leave my trash alone and even chase other birds away from it.

References

External links
Elaine Cunningham's website
Interview at Flames Rising (September 2008)

1957 births
20th-century American novelists
20th-century American women writers
21st-century American novelists
21st-century American women writers
American fantasy writers
American science fiction writers
American women novelists
Living people
Women science fiction and fantasy writers